The U.S. Naval Air Station, Sunnyvale Historic District, also known as Shenandoah Plaza, is a historic district located on  at Moffett Field, California.

Hangars One, Two, and Three, and the adjacent Shenandoah Plaza are inclusively designated as the historic district listed on the National Register of Historic Places. The Historic District was nominated by the US Navy and accepted into the National Register of Historic Places on Feb. 24, 1994. The Historic District was conveyed to NASA on July 1, 1994, as part of a federal military base reduction and closure action.

The historic district consists of:
 124 acres
 22 contributing buildings / structures
 9 contributing houses
 3 monuments
 Total floor area of historic buildings is 1,498,000

History
In 1931, the city of Sunnyvale acquired a 1,000 acre (4 km²) parcel of farmland bordering San Francisco Bay, paid for with nearly $480,000 raised by the citizens of Santa Clara County, then "sold" the parcel for $1 to the US government as a home base for the Navy airship USS Macon.

The location proved to be ideal for an airport, since the area is often clear while other parts of the San Francisco Bay are covered in fog. This is due to the Coast Range to the west which blocks the cold oceanic air which is the cause of San Francisco fog.

The base, originally named Airbase Sunnyvale CAL (it was thought that calling it Mountain View would cause officials to fear airships colliding with mountainsides), was accepted by the U.S. Navy on 12 February 1931 and dedicated NAS Sunnyvale on 12 April 1933. After the death of Rear Admiral William A. Moffett, who is credited with the creation of the airfield, in the loss of the USS Akron on 4 April 1933, the airfield at Naval Air Station Sunnyvale was named Moffett Field on 1 September 1933.

After the ditching of the USS Macon on 12 February 1935, and until 1942, the Navy transferred claimancy of Moffett Field to the War Department and the installation was under the control of the U.S. Army Air Corps.

On April 16, 1942, control of the facility was returned to the Navy and it was recommissioned as NAS Sunnyvale.  Four days later it was renamed NAS Moffett Field.  From the end of World War II until its closure, NAS Moffett Field saw the development and use of several generations of land-based anti-submarine warfare and maritime patrol aircraft, including the Lockheed P2V Neptune and Lockheed P-3 Orion. Until the demise of the USSR and for some time thereafter, daily anti-submarine, maritime reconnaissance, Fleet support, and various training sorties flew out from NAS Moffett Field to patrol along the Pacific coastline, while Moffett's other squadrons and aircraft periodically deployed to other Pacific, Indian Ocean and Persian Gulf bases for periods of up to six months.

Hangar One

Hangar One is one of the world's largest freestanding structures, covering .
The hangar was constructed in 1931.

Moffett Field's "Hangar One" was built during the Depression era for the USS Macon. Hangar One is still one of the largest unsupported structures in the country. The airship hangar is constructed on a network of steel girders sheathed with galvanized steel. It rests firmly upon a reinforced pad anchored to concrete pilings.

The airship hangar itself, measures 1,133 feet (343 m) long and 308 feet (93 m) wide. The floor covers eight acres (32,000 m²) and can accommodate Six (6) (360 feet x 160 feet) football fields.

The building has aerodynamic architecture. Its walls curve upward and inward, to form an elongated dome 198 feet (60 m) high. The clam-shell doors were designed to reduce turbulence when the Macon moved in and out on windy days. The "orange peel" doors, weighing 500 tons (511.88 tonnes) each, are moved by their own 150 horsepower motors operated via an electrical control panel.

The airship hangar's interior is so large that fog sometimes forms near the ceiling. A person unaccustomed to its vastness is susceptible to optical disorientation. Looking across its deck, planes and tractors look like toys. Along its length maintenance shops, inspection laboratories and offices help keep the hangar busy. Looking up, a network of catwalks for access to all parts of the structure can be seen. Two elevators meet near the top, allowing maintenance personnel to get to the top quickly and easily.

Narrow gauge tracks run through the length of the hangar. During the period of airship, the rails extended across the apron and into the fields at each end of the hangar. This tramway facilitated the transportation of an airship on the mooring mast to the airship hangar interior or to the flight position. During the brief period that the USS Macon (ZRS-5) was based at Moffett, Hangar One accommodated not only the giant airship but several smaller non-rigid lighter-than-air craft simultaneously.

Hangars Two and Three 

Moffett Field's Hangars Two and Three (Mountain View, California) were built at the beginning of WWII for a program of coastal defense.  The Hangars are still among the world's largest freestanding unsupported wood structures.

In 1940, the US Navy proposed to the US Congress the development of a lighter-than-air station program for anti-submarine patrolling of the coast and harbors. This program proposed the construction, in addition to the expansion at NAS and Lakehurst, the construction of new stations.

The Second Deficiency Appropriation Bill for 1941, passed July 3, 1941, changed the authorization to the construction of 8 facilities to accommodate a total of 48 airships (as requested in 1940), but due to steel rations, a total of 17 large wooden hangars were built among 10 LTA bases.

As finally developed in 1943, LTA facilities in addition to NAS Lakehurst (2) and NAS Moffett Field (2), included  NAS South Weymouth (1), NAS Weeksville (1), NAS Glynco (2),  Naval Air Station Richmond (3), NAS Houma (1), NAS Hitchcock (1), NAS Santa Ana (2) and NAS Tillamook (2). In the initial program, accommodations were provided for six airships at each station. This was later increased to twelve at seven of the stations and to eighteen at NAS Richmond as a result of an increase in the authorized strength to 200 airships.

Seven (7) of the original seventeen (17) of the wooden hangars still exist: Moffett Field (2), Tustin, California (2), Tillamook, Oregon (1), and Lakehurst, New Jersey(2).

Popular culture 
An episode of the Discovery Channel TV show MythBusters used one these smaller hangars to disprove the myth that it is not possible to fold a sheet of paper in half more than seven times. The sheet of paper covered nearly the full width of the airship hangar. Other episodes of Mythbusters have utilized the hangar to test myths such as "Inflating a football with helium allows longer kick distances" and "Airworthy aircraft can be constructed of concrete."

Other historic buildings 
Many of the buildings at Moffett Field which once supported its active military presence have been contaminated with asbestos within the structures, and require restoration.  This is an ongoing project within NASA Research Park an annex to NASA Ames Research Center

There are
 22 contributing buildings / structures
 9 contributing houses
 3 monuments

References

Sunnyvale, California
Historic districts on the National Register of Historic Places in California
National Register of Historic Places in Santa Clara County, California
Moffett Field